The bousine is a small, droneless bagpipe from the south of Normandy.  It is of Saxon origin, and arrived in Normandy in the 13th Century. 

Latinists believe its name comes from the Latin Bûcina : "trompette".  However, it may also come from the Old Norse Bųss : "conduit/tuyau". This instrument is part of the family of Norman bagpipes, which also include the loure and the haute loure.

References

Bagpipes
Norman musical instruments
French musical instruments